Silmesthri Giriraj Kaushalya (born  November 13, 1964), popularly known as Giriraj Kaushalya, is a Sri Lankan actor in Sri Lankan cinema, stage drama and television. Highly versatile actor from drama to comedy, Kaushalya also has worked as an assistant director, producer, script writer and a filmmaker.

Personal life
Kaushalya was born on 13 November 1964 in Kolonnawa, Colombo as the youngest of the family with four siblings. He has three elder brothers and one elder sister.  He entered village school in Kolonnawa and then attended to Gurukula Vidyalaya, Kelaniya. His father was an active trade unionist in Ceylon Electricity Board and a member of the Sri Lanka Communist Party represented the Left Movement. He worked in Mahaweli Authority of Sri Lanka before entering to acting.  His elder brother Lalith Janakantha is also a renowned actor in stage, television and cinema. 

He met his wife Mangalika Fernando during the work in Mahaweli Authority in Lihinyagama, Mahaweli C zone in 1986. She was a draftsman and Kaushalya was a store keeper. They engaged in 1987 and wedding was celebrated in 1988. They both left the work in 1998. The couple has two daughters - Kavindya Nilupuli and Amandya Uthpali. Eldest daughter was born on 1989 and second daughter in 1994.

He got critically ill with leukemia by the end of 2021, where he quit from acting for indefinite period. He was diagnosed with the disease in late October 2021 and in hospitalized for over 40 days at a hospital in 2022.

Acting career
He worked with veteran actor Sathischandra Edirisinghe in Mahaweli Authority during Mahaweli cultural unit. Then Edirisinghe invited him to play a role in his teledrama Namal Golla, which marked his first appearance in drama career. Then he acted in Kokila Ginna directed again by Edirisinghe.

His entrance to the stage drama was an accident. He used to go for plays with elder brother Lalith. His maiden performance on stage was to stand in for an absent actor in the play Dukgannarala by Prasannajith Abeysuriya. He joined veteran dramatist Somalatha Subasinghe's drama troupe and acted in her stage plays such as Mawakage Sangramaya, Antigany and some children plays like Hima Kumari and Thoppi Welenda. 

He continued performed in stage dramas for many years. His popular stage acting came through Somaratne Dissanayake's Mee Pura Wesiyo, Parakrama Niriella's Sekkuwa, Rodney Warnakula's Saranga Naven Evith and Priyantha Seneviratne's Minisa.

In 1997, he got the chance to work as assistant director in popular teledrama Nonavaruni Mahathvaruni directed by Jayaprakash Sivagurunathan. He also acted in some role in the drama as well. He wrote the scripts for a number of popular television comedies like Kathura and Ethuma 1, 2. His maiden television drama direction came through Nana Kamare which was telecasted on Swarnavahini. The serial stars Bandu Samarasinghe and became a hit in that year. He also directed the serial Mithra Samagama telecasted in TV Derana.

Selected stage dramas
 Mawakage Sangramaya
 Antigany
 Mee Pura Wesiyo
 Sekkuwa
 Saranga Nawen Awith
 Minisa
 Saadaya Marai Salli Hamarai
 Comedy Buddy
 Sudu Redi Horu

Selected television serials

 Ama as Sam uncle
 Dhawala Kadulla as Merchant 
 Diya Matha Ruwa 
 Ethuma 1, 2 as Kalu Mudalali
 Kotipathiyo
 Hulan Gedara as Don Meril Hulangamuwa 
 Ira Awara
 Isuru Bhavana as Kuruneru
 Jeewithaya Athi Thura
 Jeewithaya Dakinna 
 Kapa Nasna Samaya
 Kinnara Damanaya 
 Kokila Ginna
 Man Hinda 
 Namal Golla
 Me Suramya Paradisaya
 Nadagamkarayo as Kukula Mahaththaya 
 Neela Palingu Diya
 Nodath Desheka Arumawanthi
 Nonavaruni Mahathvaruni
 Pabalu Menike
 Package
 Pani Kurullo
 Pingala Danawwa
 Pinibara Yamaya
 Pipi Piyum 
 Punaragamanaya 
 Ranga Soba 
 Rathi Virathi 
 Sakala Guru as Pinsiri Podi Bandara
 Sakala Guru 2 
 Sakisanda Suwaris
 Sanda Dev Diyani 
 Sihina Genena Kumariye
 Sihinayak Wage 
 Smarana Samapthi
 Sudu Kapuru Pethi
 Suravimana
 Sihina Puraya as Bunty
 Thaksalava as Lucas Mudalali
 Wahinna Muthu Wassak
 "Nadagankarayo" as Kusumsiri Cabral aka "Kukula-Lakuna Mudalali"

Filmography
Kaushalya started his film career film Sanda Dadayama directed by Asoka Handagama, which is not screened yet. His first screened film is 1999 film Salupata Ahasata directed by Mario Jayathunga. Then he contributed in several blockbuster films such as Sikuru Hathe, Suhada Koka and Maya particularly as a comedian. 

His maiden cinematic direction came through Sikuru Hathe in 2007. The film had positive reviews from critics and won several awards at local film festivals.

As a director

Awards
He is a recipient of awards at several local film festivals.

Raigam Tele'es Awards

|-
|| 2010 ||| Isuru Bhavana || Merit Award ||

Sumathi Awards

|-
|| 2011 ||| Thaksalava || Merit Award ||

See also
 Cinema of Sri Lanka

References

External links
 Chat with Gira
 Against the Tide
 Sonduru Dadabima
 Wahinna Muthu Wessak- A tragic love story
 හිනස්සන එක ලේසි නෑ

Sri Lankan male film actors
Sinhalese male actors
Living people
1964 births